Mobley's 2nd Message is an album by jazz saxophonist Hank Mobley, released on the Prestige label in 1957. It was recorded on July 27, 1956, one week after Mobley's Message (1957), and features performances by Mobley, Kenny Dorham, Walter Bishop, Doug Watkins and Art Taylor.

Track listing 
All compositions by Hank Mobley except as indicated
 "These Are the Things I Love" (Barlow, Harris) - 6:40 
 "Message from the Border" - 6:07
 "Xlento" - 5:39
 "The Latest" - 5:52
 "I Should Care" (Cahn, Stordahl, Weston) - 10:04
 "Crazeology" (Harris) - 6:56

Personnel 
 Hank Mobley - tenor saxophone
 Kenny Dorham - trumpet
 Walter Bishop - piano
 Doug Watkins - bass
 Art Taylor - drums

References 

Hard bop albums
Hank Mobley albums
1957 albums
Prestige Records albums
Albums recorded at Van Gelder Studio